The 2014 MercedesCup was a men's tennis tournament played on outdoor clay courts. It was the 37th edition of the Stuttgart Open, and was part of the ATP World Tour 250 series of the 2014 ATP World Tour. It was held at the Tennis Club Weissenhof in Stuttgart, Germany, from 7 July until 13 July 2014. Third-seeded Roberto Bautista Agut won the singles title.

Singles main draw entrants

Seeds 

 1 Rankings are as of June 23, 2014

Other entrants 
The following players received wildcards into the singles main draw:
  Michael Berrer
  Philipp Petzschner
  Alexander Zverev

The following players received entry from the qualifying draw:
  Marco Cecchinato
  Philipp Davydenko
  Mate Delić
  Yann Marti

The following players received entry as lucky losers:
  Henri Laaksonen
  Louk Sorensen

Withdrawals
Before the tournament
  Marcel Granollers
  Tommy Haas (shoulder injury)
  Denis Istomin
  Martin Kližan (left wrist injury)
  Édouard Roger-Vasselin (left knee injury)

Doubles main draw entrants

Seeds 

 Rankings are as of June 23, 2014

Other entrants 
The following pairs received wildcards into the doubles main draw:
  Michael Berrer /  Alexander Zverev
  Robin Kern /  Nicolas Reissig
The following pair received entry as alternates:
  Peter Gojowczyk /  Dominik Meffert

Withdrawals 
Before the tournament
  Martin Kližan (left wrist injury)

Finals

Singles 

  Roberto Bautista Agut defeated  Lukáš Rosol, 6–3, 4–6, 6–2

Doubles 

  Mateusz Kowalczyk /  Artem Sitak defeated  Guillermo García-López /  Philipp Oswald, 2–6, 6–1, [10–7]

References

External links 
 
 ATP tournament profile

Stuttgart Open
Stuttgart Open
Stutt